Tom Blue (died 1910) was an enslaved personal servant and coachman of Sam Houston, who purchased Blue prior to his marriage to Margaret Lea. He worked for Houston for nearly 30 years. In the fall of 1862, he ran away with another servant, a boy named Walter Hume. They traveled together to Laredo, Texas and Blue sold Hume for $800. He crossed into Mexico, where he lived as a free man. Blue later settled in Harrisburg, where he married a woman who was around age 30. He said at the time that he was 119.

Early life
Tom Blue, of West Indian and European descent, was born in Pennsylvania between 1790 and 1817. He was enslaved in Kentucky and ran away in 1832. Blue lived in Houston, Texas "when the stars fell" (Great Meteor Storm of 1833).

Sam Houston

Enslaved during Houston's military career
In the meantime, Sam Houston resigned his post as Governor of Tennessee (1829) and he settled in Indian Territory. In late 1832, Houston moved to Mexican Texas and established a law practice in Nacogdoches. Mexican law prohibited any religion but Catholic, and Houston converted to the faith at the Nacogdoches home of Adolphus Sterne.

In 1834, Blue was purchased in Tennessee by Houston. The Consultation of October 1835 to March 1836 convened in San Felipe de Austin on November 3, and created of a constitutional provisional government and the Provisional Army of Texas, a paid force of 2,500 troops. Houston was named commander-in-chief of the new army and in charge of training those who enlisted. On April 21, 1836, Houston's troops attacked the Mexican army during the 18-minute Battle of San Jacinto. Although outnumbered, and with Houston wounded, the Texans were victorious against General Antonio López de Santa Anna of Mexico. 

On May 7, the Yellowstone steamboat transported Houston and his prisoner Santa Anna, along with the government Santa Anna tried to extinguish, to Galveston Island. Blue said he served with Houston at the battle, and was detailed by Houston to serve the captured Mexican general. From there, the government and Santa Anna traveled to Velasco for the signing of treaties. Houston had suffered a serious wound to his foot during the battle and on May 28 boarded the schooner Flora for medical treatment in New Orleans. 
Houston won the 1836 presidential election for the Republic of Texas.

Role in the Houston household
Blue was Houston's body guard and coachman. He was also described as a "negro retainer" along with a man named Esau (also Esaw), both of whom were acquired before Houston's marriage to Margaret Lea. Blue was described as "a fine-looking mulatto with the manners and speech of a high-class gentleman."

Houston had twelve enslaved people when he became the Governor of Texas. Blue, Joshua Houston and Jeff transported Houston, his family, and their belongings to the Governor's Mansion in Austin. One of the maids was named Eliza. Aunt Mary and her daughters Creasy and Mary were also enslaved by Houston. There was not enough room in the mansion for his family and all of the enslaved people, so the male servants had quarters in the stable.

Throughout his life, Houston had a penchant for travel and his family and their servants learned to become "as mobile as the calvary".

Flight
Blue left Huntsville, Texas for Mexico in the fall of 1862. He traveled with a boy named Walter Hume who was also held by Houston. Since Blue spoke in a refined manner and looked like a Spaniard, they decided that the safest approach was to present themselves as slave and master. They traveled together to Laredo where Blue sold Walter for $800. He then crossed the border into Mexico.

Houston's slaves
Blue has been said to have runaway just before Houston freed his slaves. Houston was said to have conveyed to them Abraham Lincoln's September 1862 Emancipation Proclamation, which would free all enslaved people on January 1, 1863. According to the story published in James Haley's Sam Houston, Houston decided to free them immediately. However, the Emancipation Proclamation was not announced in Texas until June 1865, Juneteenth.

Later life
Blue worked at the Harris County Courthouse, where he met Judge Vasmer. He later received a pension from the county. He was married on September 2, 1909, to 30-year-old Camille Milton by Judge Vasmer. Blue said that he was age 119 at the time.

He lived in Harris County, Texas most of his life. He was a religious man who quoted Biblical scripture and attended church in Harrisburg. Blue never learned to read or write.

Blue died in Harrisburg of old age in July 1910 and was interred at the Harrisburg-Jackson Cemetery. He is mentioned on a Texas historical marker as one of the interred African American citizens of Harrisburg.

Notes

References

Sources

 

Date of birth uncertain
1910 deaths
People from Tennessee
People from Texas
Fugitive American slaves
Sam Houston
19th-century births
18th-century births